2015 Cotton Bowl Classic can refer to:

 2015 Cotton Bowl Classic (January), played as part of the 2014–15 college football bowl season between the Baylor Bears and the Michigan State Spartans
 2015 Cotton Bowl Classic (December), played as part of the 2015–16 college football bowl season serving as a College Football Playoff semifinal between the Alabama Crimson Tide and the Michigan State Spartans